William Alfred Freret, Sr. (1804 – June 14, 1864) was Mayor of New Orleans from May 10, 1840, to April 4, 1842, and again from February 27, 1843, to May 12, 1844.

He was born in New Orleans, and was of mixed English and French descent; his father was an English merchant who settled in New Orleans and married a Creole woman. His father built on the boy's natural mechanical talent, sending him to Europe to be educated in engineering and the mechanical arts. He returned to New Orleans and eventually succeeded to his father's business of compressing cotton for shipment abroad. Under his direction, the Freret Cotton Press Company became the first large industrial firm in New Orleans, and propelled him to public visibility and a political career. Despite his mixed European heritage, he joined the Native American Party, a new political group that sought to limit the influence on public affairs of Creoles and other groups viewed as "foreign."  Under its banner he won the 1840 mayoral election, with 1,051 votes to the 942 of his predecessor Charles Genois.

His meticulous temperament made him one of the most efficient mayors in New Orleans' history; he was a hands-on administrator notorious for his surprise inspections of city facilities, for example. His term was marked by the continuation of the city's recovery from the combined effects of the borrowing and spending of previous mayors and the nationwide economic crisis of 1837; and hampered by the curious administration he inherited, in which the city was divided into three autonomous — and often acrimoniously competing — "Municipalities". Despite these difficulties, he succeeded in establishing a free public school system and obtaining backing for it at the state level. This is considered to be his greatest achievement.

At the expiration of his term he ran for re-election but lost to Denis Prieur, a former mayor; who, however, was mayor for only eight months, resigning to take a state office. Freret was elected, this time as a Whig, to serve the remainder of Prieur's term. He ran for a third term in the elections of 1844; but they seem to have been marked by widespread fraud. In any case, he lost to Joseph Edgard Montegut.

In 1850, he was appointed Collector of the Port of New Orleans by President Zachary Taylor.

William Freret's remains were interred in New Orleans' St. Patrick Cemetery.  The city's Freret Street was named for him.

References

External links
The Genois, Freret and Montegut Administrations (Kendall's History of New Orleans, Chapter 9)
Freret in the Louisiana Historical Association's Dictionary of Louisiana Biography (Scroll down)

1804 births
1864 deaths
Mayors of New Orleans
Cotton press
19th-century American politicians